William Chamberlin may refer to:

William Henry Chamberlin (1897–1969), American historian and journalist
William Henry Chamberlin (philosopher) (1870–1921), American theologian and Mormon philosopher
William Chamberlain (politician) (1755–1828), Vermont politician who signed his name "Chamberlin"

See also
William Chamberlain (disambiguation)